Dejan Godar (born 19 May 1978) is Croatian retired footballer who last played for Degerfors IF in the Swedish Division 1. He is originally from the village of Tavankut in Bačka in autonomous province of Vojvodina, Serbia.

Club career
Godar previously played for Tavankut, Spartak Subotica, FC Szeged, Solunac Karađorđevo, Vojvodina, Osijek (in 2000/01), Belišće, INKER (2002/03). Godar joined Finnish club RoPS in 2003, and he played the 2004 and 2005 seasons in the Veikkausliiga. In the spring of 2008, he joined Swedish club Degerfors IF. After one season spell in Sweden Godar joined Albanian club KS Bylish Ballsh and then returned playing in 2010 with Degerfors again.

Awards
On the first "Croatian European Club Championship" held in December 2006 in Split, Croatia, he won the 3rd place with his squad of Vojvodina Croats, and Godar was declared as the best player of the tournament.

2007 he was pronounced as Player of the Year in Finnish 2. division, Ykkönen. That season his excellent games in RoPS brought his club the promotion to Finnish top division Veikkausliiga.

Honours
Bylis
 Albanian First Division: 2009–10

References

  Veikkausliiga.com - Spotlight: Kauden 2007 tähtisadetta lauantaina

External links
 
  Subotičke novine Dejan Godar najbolji igrač
  Dnevnik Habi u Zagrebu

1978 births
Living people
Sportspeople from Subotica
Croats of Vojvodina
Serbian emigrants to Croatia
Association football midfielders
Croatian footballers 
FK Spartak Subotica players
Szeged LC footballers
FK Vojvodina players
NK Osijek players
NK Belišće players
NK Inter Zaprešić players
Rovaniemen Palloseura players
Degerfors IF players
KF Bylis Ballsh players
Second League of Serbia and Montenegro players
Croatian Football League players
First Football League (Croatia) players
Veikkausliiga players
Superettan players
Kategoria Superiore players
Ettan Fotboll players
Croatian expatriate footballers
Expatriate footballers in Hungary
Croatian expatriate sportspeople in Hungary
Expatriate footballers in Finland
Croatian expatriate sportspeople in Finland
Expatriate footballers in Sweden
Croatian expatriate sportspeople in Sweden
Expatriate footballers in Albania
Croatian expatriate sportspeople in Albania